Onken may refer to:

 12868 Onken, a main-belt asteroid
 Anne Onken (born 1977), German radio presenter and comedian
 Onken GmbH, German dairy company founded by Hermann Onken, now part of Emmi AG

See also
Oncken (disambiguation)